Alexander Manson (born 20 May 1953) is a Canadian rower. He competed in the men's eight event at the 1976 Summer Olympics.

References

External links
 
 

1953 births
Living people
Canadian male rowers
Olympic rowers of Canada
Rowers at the 1976 Summer Olympics
Rowers from Vancouver